Sofia Sergeevna Levkovskaya (25 November 1965 – 20 June 2011) was a Russian composer.

Levkovskaya has used musical citations in her compositions. Musical critic Alexander Kharkovsky noted the highly theatrical form in her music, the use of catchy slogans as titles of her works, as well as the detailed thoughtfulness of the ideas.

References

Bibliography 

 Khazdan, E. V. "Instrumental Theater of Sofia Levkovskaya", Opera Musicologica. 2012. No 4 (14). pp. 97–114.
 Sofia Levkovskaya, KinoPoisk
 Levkovskaya, S. S. "Instrumental Theater: visual and sound dictate of the scene", Musicus. 2008. No. 1 (10).
 Levkovskaya, S. S. "Words. Sounds. Movements", Musicus. 2010. Nos. 1–2 (20–21).
 Levkovskaya, S. S.; Kharkovsky A.Z. "Free Electron of Anatoly Korolev", Musicus. 2009. No. 3 (16).
 Levkovskaya, S. S.; Vladimir Martynov  "Casus Vita Nova", Opera Musicologica. 2010. No. 2 [4].

External links 
 Audio recordings of Sofia Levkovskaya's works
 

1965 births
2011 deaths
Russian composers
Musicians from Saint Petersburg